Urich's tyrannulet (Phyllomyias urichi) is a species of bird in the family Tyrannidae. It is endemic to Venezuela. Its natural habitat is subtropical or tropical moist montane forests. It is threatened by habitat loss.

It is a very rare species that had previously only been seen three times: once in 1899, a second time in the 1940s, and a third time in 2005. In May 2021, an expedition to rediscover the species was undertaken in order to verify that it had not yet gone extinct. However, the locality the species was sighted at in 2005 had been deforested by that point, and several other potential habitats had also been degraded. However, a thickly forested mountainside near Yucucual, Monagas was identified in a photo on Instagram as a potential habitat for the species. The expedition to this area was successful in spotting 2 different pairs of P. urichi, marking the first observation of the species in over a decade and the first clear photos and sound recordings ever taken of the species.

It is olive-green in color and has a shrill call. Ornithologist David Ascanio, who led the team that rediscovered the species, has described it as resembling a "little tiny Shrek" due to its coloration.

References

External links
BirdLife Species Factsheet.

Urich's tyrannulet
Birds of the Venezuelan Coastal Range
Endemic birds of Venezuela
Urich's tyrannulet
Taxonomy articles created by Polbot